Jonathan Daniel Hamm (born March 10, 1971) is an American actor. He is best known for his role as Don Draper in the period drama television series Mad Men (2007–2015), for which he won a Golden Globe Award for Best Actor in a Television Series – Drama in 2008 and 2016, two Screen Actors Guild Awards for Outstanding Ensemble in a Drama Series, and the Primetime Emmy Award for Outstanding Lead Actor in a Drama Series in 2015. He received 16 Primetime Emmy Award nominations for acting in and producing Mad Men and for his guest appearances on 30 Rock and Unbreakable Kimmy Schmidt.

He has appeared in the Sky Arts series A Young Doctor's Notebook, the Channel 4 dystopian anthology series Black Mirror, the Amazon Prime fantasy series Good Omens, and the FX superhero series Legion (2018). He guest starred in the sitcoms 30 Rock, Unbreakable Kimmy Schmidt, Parks and Recreation, Curb Your Enthusiasm, and in the Netflix comedy series Wet Hot American Summer: First Day of Camp.

Hamm is also known for his leading film roles in Stolen (2010), Million Dollar Arm (2014), Keeping Up with the Joneses (2016), Beirut (2018), and Confess, Fletch (2022), as well as his supporting roles in The Day the Earth Stood Still (2008), The Town (2010), Sucker Punch (2011), Bridesmaids (2011), Friends with Kids (2012), Baby Driver (2017), Tag (2018), Bad Times at the El Royale (2018), Lucy in the Sky (2019), The Report (2019), Richard Jewell (2019), No Sudden Move (2021), and Top Gun: Maverick (2022). He also voiced roles in the animated films Shrek Forever After (2010) and Minions (2015).

Early life
Hamm was born on March 10, 1971, in St. Louis, Missouri, the son of Deborah ( Garner) Hamm, a secretary, and Daniel Hamm, who managed a family trucking company. He is of German, English and Irish descent; his surname came from German immigrants. He was raised Catholic.

His parents divorced when he was two years old, and he lived in the St. Louis suburb of Creve Coeur with his mother until her death from colon cancer when he was ten. He then lived with his father and grandmother in nearby Normandy.

His first acting role was as Winnie-the-Pooh in first grade. At 16, he was cast as Judas in the play Godspell and enjoyed the experience, though he did not take acting seriously. He attended John Burroughs School, a private school in Ladue, where he was a member of the football, baseball, and swim teams. During this time he dated Sarah Clarke, who became an actress. His father died when he was 20.

After graduation in 1989, Hamm enrolled at the University of Texas. He was a member of the Upsilon chapter of Sigma Nu fraternity, and was arrested for participating in a violent hazing incident during his third year.

He later transferred to the University of Missouri. He answered an advertisement from a theater company seeking players for a production of A Midsummer Night's Dream and was cast in the production. Other roles followed, such as Leon Czolgosz in Assassins.

Assault incident 
While a member of Sigma Nu fraternity at the University of Texas, Hamm was arrested for participating in a violent hazing incident in November 1990. He lit a pledge's jeans on fire, shoved his face in the dirt, and struck him with a paddle over his right kidney, before leading the pledge around the fraternity house with a hammer claw around the pledge's testicles. The incident resulted in the fraternity being shut down. The pledge ended up needing medical care, and ultimately withdrew from school. Hamm made a plea deal and completed probation under the terms of a deferred adjudication, allowing him to avoid being convicted of a crime. The charges were dismissed in August 1995 following the completion of his probation.

Acting career
After graduating in 1993 with a Bachelor of Arts degree in English, Hamm returned to his high school to teach eighth-grade acting. One of his students was Ellie Kemper, who became an actress. Years later, Hamm appeared in Kemper's Netflix series Unbreakable Kimmy Schmidt.

Early work
Hamm, who didn't wish to pursue a "normal career", moved to Los Angeles permanently in 1995. He moved into a house with four other aspiring actors and began working as a waiter while attending auditions. He acted in theater, including as Flavius in a production of Shakespeare's Timon of Athens with the Sacred Fools Theater Company.

Looking older than his age, he found it difficult to find work as an actor, despite representation by the William Morris Agency. In 1998, after he failed to get any acting work for three years, William Morris dropped him as a client.

He continued working as a waiter and, briefly, worked as a set designer for a softcore pornography movie. He decided that his 30th birthday would be his deadline to succeed in Hollywood, and has said: 

In 2000, Hamm landed the role of romantic firefighter Burt Ridley on NBC's drama series Providence. His one-episode contract grew to 19 and allowed him to quit waiting tables. He made his feature movie debut with one line in Clint Eastwood's adventure film Space Cowboys (2000). More substantial roles followed in the independent comedy Kissing Jessica Stein (2001) and the war film We Were Soldiers (2002), during which he turned 30.

His career was bolstered by his recurring role of police inspector Nate Basso on Lifetime's television series The Division from 2002 to 2004. Other minor roles followed on the television series What About Brian, CSI: Miami, Related, Numb3rs, The Unit, and The Sarah Silverman Program. Hamm's Mad Men castmate Eric Ladin said in an interview that he admired Hamm because he was persistent until he became successful as an actor.

International recognition
Hamm landed his breakthrough role in 2007, when he was chosen from over 80 candidates to play the protagonist character Don Draper in AMC's drama series Mad Men. In the series, set in a fictional 1960s Madison Avenue ad agency, he played a suave, married, philandering executive with an obscure past. He recalled, "I read the script for Mad Men and I loved it... I never thought they'd cast me—I mean, I thought they'd go with one of the five guys who look like me but are movie stars". He believes that an actor with a "proven track record" would likely have been chosen if another network had produced the show. He went through numerous auditions; each time he explained to the casting directors what he could bring to the character, if given the part. Alan Taylor and Mad Men creator Matthew Weiner initially thought he was "too handsome" for the role, but ultimately decided, "it was perfect to cast sort of the perfect male in this part". Weiner also sensed that Hamm had suffered the early loss of his parents, similarly to Draper's backstory. Hamm says that he used memories of his father to portray Draper, a well-dressed, influential man of business and society hiding great inner turmoil and experiencing changes in the world beyond his control.

Mad Men debuted on July 19, 2007, with almost 1.4 million viewers. It developed a loyal audience, with Hamm receiving strong reviews. Robert Bianco of USA Today described Hamm's portrayal of Draper as "a starmaking performance", and The Boston Globes Matthew Gilbert called Hamm a "brilliant lead".

In 2008, Hamm won the Golden Globe Award for Best Actor in a Television Series – Drama and was nominated for the Screen Actors Guild Award for Outstanding Performance by a Male Actor and the Primetime Emmy Award for Outstanding Lead Actor in a Drama Series. In 2009, he was again nominated for the Golden Globe Award and Screen Actors Guild Award in the same category, and received another Primetime Emmy Award nomination for Outstanding Lead Actor in a Drama Series. In 2010, he received his third Golden Globe Award nomination. Mad Men concluded its seven-season run on May 17, 2015. Hamm received his first Primetime Emmy Award for Outstanding Lead Actor in a Drama Series on September 20, 2015, after receiving 12 nominations for acting in and producing the series.

Hamm's next film role was in the 2008 science fiction movie The Day the Earth Stood Still, a remake of the classic 1951 film of the same name. It received mixed reviews but was financially successful, earning $230 million worldwide. Hamm hosted Saturday Night Live, season 34, episode 6, on October 25, 2008, and played various roles, including Don Draper in two sketches. He returned as host again on January 30 and October 30, 2010. In 2009, he guest-starred in three episodes of the NBC television sitcom 30 Rock as Drew Baird, a doctor who is a neighbor and love interest of Liz Lemon (Tina Fey). For these performances, he received three nominations for the Primetime Emmy Award for Outstanding Guest Actor in a Comedy Series.

Hamm's first leading film role came with the independent mystery thriller Stolen in 2009, in which he played a police officer whose son has been missing for eight years. In 2010 he had a minor voice role in the animated feature Shrek Forever After as an ogre leader named Brogan, and appeared as an FBI agent in the crime drama The Town with Ben Affleck. After receiving "about 40 scripts that were all set in the 60s, or had me playing advertising guys", Hamm was pleased that The Town offered him a role that was "the opposite to Don Draper". It received generally favorable reviews and earned $144 million worldwide.

His next acting role was as defense attorney Jake Ehrlich in the independent film Howl, based on Allen Ginsberg's eponymous 1956 poem. On December 12, 2010, he made a guest appearance as an FBI supervisor on Fox's animated series The Simpsons. He was featured in Zack Snyder's action-fantasy film Sucker Punch (2011) as the character High Roller and the doctor. He also had a supporting role in the comedy Bridesmaids as Kristen Wiig's "rude and arrogant sex buddy". He was next seen in the independent feature Friends with Kids (2011), which he produced with his then-partner Jennifer Westfeldt. The story concerns a group of friends whose lives are changed as the couples in the group begin to have children.

He had a recurring role in the sitcom The Increasingly Poor Decisions of Todd Margaret in 2012, as the servant of sociopathic billionaire Dave Mountford (Blake Harrison). He hosted the 21st ESPYS Awards on July 17, 2013. He played sports agent J.B. Bernstein in Disney's sports drama Million Dollar Arm (2014). He appeared with Daniel Radcliffe in A Young Doctor's Notebook, playing an older version of Radcliffe's character, from December 2012 to December 2013. In December 2014, he guest-starred in a special Christmas episode of the British science fiction anthology series Black Mirror, titled "White Christmas". He had a number of roles in 2015, including the comedy show Unbreakable Kimmy Schmidt and Wet Hot American Summer: First Day of Camp. He was featured in the animated comedy Minions as the voice of Herb Overkill. Despite mixed reviews, the film was a major success, grossing over $1 billion worldwide.

Hamm featured in the Greg Mottola comedy Keeping Up with the Joneses, alongside Zach Galifianakis and Gal Gadot; the film was filmed during the spring of 2015 and was released in October 2016 (after being delayed seven months). In 2017, he appeared in the science fiction film Marjorie Prime, which premiered at the 2017 Sundance Film Festival, and subsequently appeared in Edgar Wright's comedy crime film Baby Driver and the drama Aardvark, which premiered at the 2017 South by Southwest Festival and the 2017 Tribeca Film Festival, respectively. In 2018, Hamm appeared in the drama Nostalgia and the political thriller Beirut.

Hamm appeared in the BBC and Amazon's 2019 television adaptation of Terry Pratchett and Neil Gaiman's Good Omens as the Archangel Gabriel.

In 2022, Hamm appeared in Top Gun: Maverick, the sequel to 1986's Top Gun. The same year Hamm reunited with Greg Mottola on their second collaboration and his Mad Men co-star John Slattery for Confess, Fletch. It is the first installment in the Fletch series to not star Chevy Chase in the titular role. Hamm plays Fletch in the film and received positive reviews for his performance and comedic timing. It was released theatrically on September 16, 2022, and will land on Showtime on October 28, 2022. Also in 2022, Hamm was cast in a lead role as Roy in the upcoming fifth season of the FX black comedy crime drama anthology series Fargo, reuniting him with series creator/showrunner Noah Hawley, whom he'd previously worked with on Legion (2018) and Lucy in the Sky (2019).

Commercials and product endorsements
In 2010, Mercedes-Benz hired Hamm (replacing actor Richard Thomas) as the new voiceover of their commercials, beginning with a commercial for the S400 Hybrid campaign. In 2013, American Airlines debuted a television commercial titled "Change is in the Air", featuring Hamm's voice-over. Hamm is an American Airlines frequent flier and his Mad Men character Don Draper often spoke of aspiring to win such accounts as American Airlines. Hamm has also appeared in several commercials in an ongoing ad campaign for H&R Block income tax services. He also appears in ongoing ads in Canada for SkipTheDishes. In January 2022 he appeared on an Apple TV+ ad titled "Everyone but Jon Hamm" showcasing the streaming service's wide array of A-list actresses and actors participating in original Apple productions. Also in 2022, Hamm was featured in a series of TV commercials for Progressive Insurance as having an off-and-on relationship with spokesperson Flo.

Public image 
Internationally considered to be a sex symbol, Hamm was named one of Salon.coms Sexiest Man Living in 2007 and one of People magazine's Sexiest Men Alive in 2008.  Entertainment Weekly named him one of their Entertainers of the Year in both 2008 and 2010. Hamm also won GQs "International Man" award in September 2010.

Personal life

Hamm quit smoking at age 24, but his role as Don Draper required him to smoke. Instead of actual cigarettes, he smoked herbal cigarettes that did not contain tobacco or nicotine.

In March 2015, Hamm's representative confirmed that he had recently completed in-patient treatment for alcoholism. Hamm also reported developing vitiligo during the filming of Mad Men.

Relationships
Hamm was in a long-term relationship with actress and screenwriter Jennifer Westfeldt from 1997 to 2015. Of their relationship, he said in 2008: "We may not have a piece of paper that says we're husband and wife, but after 10 years, Jennifer is more than just a girlfriend. What we have is much deeper and we both know that. To me, people get married when they're ready to have kids, which I'm not ruling out." Along with Westfeldt, Hamm appeared in Gap-related campaign advertisements. In April 2009, Hamm and Westfeldt formed their own production company, Points West Pictures.

In February 2023, Hamm became engaged to actress Anna Osceola after two years of dating.

Sports involvement
Hamm is a devoted fan of the St. Louis Blues National Hockey League (NHL) team and has appeared in two television advertisements for the team. He is also a fan of the St. Louis Cardinals Major League Baseball (MLB) team and narrated the official highlight movie for the 2011 World Series, won by the Cardinals. He also narrates the Amazon NFL documentary series All or Nothing, as of 2015. In 2012, he played in the MLB Legend and Celebrity All Star Softball game as a member of the National League. He represented the Cardinals and hit a home run during the game. In 2018, he narrated the video The Saint Louis Browns: The Team That Baseball Forgot, presented by the Saint Louis Browns Historical Society.

Political views 
In 2012 United States presidential election Hamm supported incumbent President Barack Obama. In 2014, Hamm, Kerry Washington, and Kevin Love appeared in a PSA for stopping sexual assault on college campuses.

In October 2016, Hamm attended a Broadway fundraiser for Hillary Clinton.

Filmography

Awards and nominations

Hamm has won an Emmy, two Golden Globes, and two Screen Actors Guild Awards, among others.

References

Further reading
 Rochlin, Margy. "Those Were the Good Old Days? Hardly". The New York Times. September 30, 2007; accessed February 12, 2009.
 Alston, Joshua. "Bryan Cranston and Jon Hamm: Get 'Bad,' Get 'Mad,' and You'll Get Glad". Newsweek. December 31, 2007; accessed June 4, 2009.
 Hainey, Michael. "The Man in the Gray (Indestructible) Suit". GQ. January 1, 2008; accessed June 18, 2009.
 Wilson, Benji. "Jon Hamm: Why Mad Men Was an Instant Star". The Daily Telegraph. March 14, 2008; accessed February 12, 2009.
 Seltzer, Ian. "Jon Hamm: Suave, Successful, Mad Man". ABC News. July 14, 2008; accessed April 28, 2009.
 Ryan, Maureen. "'Mad Men' Calvacade of Stars, Part 2: Jon Hamm". Chicago Tribune. July 15, 2008; accessed February 12, 2009.
 Guest, Jocelyn. "Jon Hamm of 'Mad Men' on the Future of Don Draper". New York. July 24, 2008; accessed February 12, 2009.
 Neuman, Clayton. "Q&A – Jon Hamm". AMC. October 26, 2008; accessed February 12, 2009.
 Wolf, Jeanne. "Jon Hamm's Sudden Fame". Parade; accessed April 27, 2009.
 Hill, Erin. "Jon Hamm: 'Everyone Deserves a Little Good-Natured Ribbing'". Parade. March 11, 2010; accessed March 11, 2010.

External links

 
 
 

1971 births
Living people
20th-century American male actors
21st-century American male actors
American male film actors
American male television actors
American male voice actors
American people of English descent
American people of German descent
American people of Irish descent
American television directors
Audiobook narrators
Best Drama Actor Golden Globe (television) winners
California Democrats
Film producers from Missouri
Male actors from St. Louis
New York (state) Democrats
The New Yorker people
Outstanding Performance by a Lead Actor in a Drama Series Primetime Emmy Award winners
People from St. Louis County, Missouri
People with vitiligo
Missouri Democrats
University of Missouri alumni
University of Texas at Austin alumni
Television producers from Missouri
Former Roman Catholics